The Quinkan ctenotus (Ctenotus quinkan) is a species of Australian skink, a lizard in the family Scincidae.

Description

Taxonomy
The species was first formally described by Glen Ingram in 1979.

Distribution 
The species is endemic to the area around Cooktown in Queensland in Australia. It has only been recorded in the sandstone escarpments of the Cooktown-Laura area.

Publications 
 Ingram, 1979 : Two new species of skinks, genus Ctenotus (Reptilia, Lacertilia, Scincidae), from Cape York Peninsula, Queensland, Australia. Journal of Herpetology, .

References

External links 
 
 

quinkan
Taxa named by Glen Joseph Ingram